Teodor T. Burada (3 October 1839 – 17 February 1923) was a Romanian folklorist, ethnographer and musicologist and member of the Romanian Academy (elected in 1878, the first musician to achieve this position).

In 1884 he unearthed fragments of pottery and terracotta figurines near the village of Cucuteni, Iași County, which led to the discovery of the Cucuteni-Trypillian culture, a major Neolithic archaeological culture.

Burada played the violin, studying at Iași Conservatory (1855–1860) and the Paris Conservatory (1861–1865). He traveled widely in Eastern Europe on concert tours, and took the opportunity in his travels to collect folklore material, especially among Romanian communities. His publications include material on music education and many other musical topics. He was the editor of Dicţionar muzical (c. 1862–75), the earliest Romanian dictionary of music.

References

Corresponding members of the Romanian Academy
1839 births
1923 deaths